Temsaman is a region located in the Rif, northeast of Morocco. Temsamane is the main city in the region. The center of the province is Kerouna. The province of Temsaman includes smaller villages such as: Boudinar, Amezarou, Ajdir, Takseft n Dhar, Budinar, and Icniwen.

History
In this region, the Spanish general Silvestre was defeated by the Berber resistance under Abd el-Krim's command. It was also the first seat of the Kingdom of Nekor.

External links 
 Pictures from Temsamane
 Videos from Temsamane
 Weekmarkt in Temsamane

Rif
Populated places in Oriental (Morocco)